Gender preference may refer to:
Sex selection, the attempt to influence the sex of the offspring
Gender identity, personal identification of gender